Jesse Loy Powell (April 14, 1947 – June 14, 2012) was a professional American football linebacker in the National Football League. He attended West Texas A&M. He played linebacker and special teams with the Miami Dolphins from 1969 to 1973.

Powell was a member of the Dolphins during their perfect season of 1972 when the team had a 17-0 combined record in the regular season and playoffs and won Super Bowl VII. Early in the 1973 season he was bothered by a chronic knee injury he suffered the prior season, which required season-ending surgery after 3 games to remove bone chips. He announced his retirement from pro football just before the start of the 1974 preseason.  Overall, Powell played for three Super Bowl teams.

Following retirement from the NFL, Powell briefly worked in the food industry before working with State Farm Insurance for 35 years. He retired from that company on March 31, 2012.

Powell died in a Texas hospital on June 14, 2012. His brother told a local news agency that the mechanism of death was cardiac arrest, but a formal cause of death had not been established.

References

External links 
 Pro-Football reference

1947 births
2012 deaths
People from Matador, Texas
Players of American football from Texas
American football linebackers
West Texas A&M Buffaloes football players
Miami Dolphins players